Jeff Matsuda (born 1970) is an American animator and concept and comics artist who served as the chief character designer for both Jackie Chan Adventures and The Batman and is the president and creative director of X-Ray Kid Studios. Matsuda was discovered by Rob Liefeld after submitting some Wildcats samples pages to Liefeld's Extreme Studios and Jim Lee's Wildstorm. However, Matsuda's first published artwork, depicting the X-Force character Cable, appeared in the letter art section of Wizard Magazine.

Career
While at Extreme, he penciled issues of the Image Comics titles Brigade, Team Youngblood, Youngblood Strikefile, Troll and New Men. Matsuda moved on to work for Marvel Comics beginning with some pages for X-Men Prime, which eventually led to runs on X-Factor and Wolverine in addition to work on individual issues of X-Men, Generation X, Avengers and some pinup drawings in X-Men Unlimited.

Matsuda was later reunited with Liefeld at Awesome Comics which published Kaboom, written by award-winning writer Jeph Loeb. The protagonist of the title featured a third spelling of its creator's first names, Geoff, though in Loeb's case, Jeph is actually short for Joseph.

Jeff Matsuda led the team designing the look of Google Lively.

References

External links

Jeff Matsuda's Blog site
X-Ray Kid Studios website

American comics artists
American animators
American animated film producers
Living people
1970 births
American people of Japanese descent
20th-century American artists